Mordellistena vogti is a species of beetle in the genus Mordellistena of the family Mordellidae. It was described by Ermisch in 1963.

References

External links
Coleoptera. BugGuide.

vogti
Endemic fauna of Germany
Beetles described in 1963